Dubiefostola auricollis is a species of beetle in the family Cerambycidae, the only species in the genus Dubiefostola.

References

Hesperophanini